Pygora cowani is a species of Scarabaeidae, the dung beetle family.

Subspecies
P. cowani clementi (Ruter, 1964)

References 

Cetoniinae
Beetles described in 1878